The 2018 Winston–Salem Open was a men's tennis tournament played on outdoor hard courts. It was the 50th edition of the Winston-Salem Open (as successor to previous tournaments in New Haven and Long Island), and part of the ATP World Tour 250 Series of the 2018 ATP World Tour. It took place at Wake Forest University in Winston-Salem, North Carolina, United States, from August 19 through August 25, 2018. It was the last event on the 2018 US Open Series before the 2018 US Open.

Singles main-draw entrants

Seeds

* Rankings are as of August 13, 2018

Other entrants
The following players received wildcards into the singles main draw:
  Kyle Edmund
  Taylor Fritz
  Borna Gojo
  Andrey Rublev

The following players received entry from the qualifying draw:
  Radu Albot
  Tommy Paul
  Brayden Schnur
  Horacio Zeballos

The following players received entry as lucky losers:
  Guido Andreozzi
  Dominik Köpfer
  Franko Škugor

Withdrawals
Before the tournament
  Alexandr Dolgopolov → replaced by  Guido Pella
  Jared Donaldson → replaced by  Franko Škugor
  Damir Džumhur → replaced by  Dominik Köpfer
  David Goffin → replaced by  Guido Andreozzi
  Mikhail Kukushkin → replaced by  Laslo Đere
  Feliciano López → replaced by  Marcos Baghdatis
  Fernando Verdasco → replaced by  Jaume Munar

During the tournament
  Gilles Simon

Doubles main-draw entrants

Seeds

 Rankings are as of August 13, 2018

Other entrants
The following pairs received wildcards into the doubles main draw:
  James Cerretani /  Leander Paes
  Lleyton Hewitt /  John Peers

The following pair received entry as alternates:
  Max Mirnyi /  Philipp Oswald

Withdrawals
Before the tournament
  Lleyton Hewitt

Champions

Singles

  Daniil Medvedev def.  Steve Johnson, 6–4, 6–4

Doubles

  Jean-Julien Rojer /  Horia Tecău def.  James Cerretani /  Leander Paes, 6–4, 6–2

External links
Official website

2018 ATP World Tour
2018 US Open Series
2018 in American tennis
2018
August 2018 sports events in the United States